Van Wyck-Lefferts Tide Mill is a historic tide mill located at Lloyd Harbor in Suffolk County, New York.  It was built about 1793 and is a -story, gable-roofed, timber-framed rectangular building little altered since the early 19th century.  The property also includes the earthen mill dam with sluice gates.  The Nature Conservancy, which owns the mill, offers free boat tours to the site from May through October.

It was added to the National Register of Historic Places in 1978.

References

External links
 
Information about the mill and tours - Huntington Historical Society

Lefferts family
Grinding mills on the National Register of Historic Places in New York (state)
Historic American Engineering Record in New York (state)
Industrial buildings completed in 1793
Buildings and structures in Suffolk County, New York
Grinding mills in New York (state)
Tide mills
National Register of Historic Places in Suffolk County, New York
1793 establishments in New York (state)